Peters Creek and Peter Creek may refer to:

Communities
Chugiak, Alaska, includes a community named Peters Creek
Peters Creek, Illinois
Peter Creek, Kentucky
Peters Creek Township, Stokes County, North Carolina

Streams
 Peters Creek (California)
 Peter Creek (Missouri)
 Peters Creek (Twelvemile Creek), a stream in Missouri
 Peters Creek (Montana), a stream in Flathead County
 Peters Creek (Pennsylvania)
 Peters Creek (Victoria)

Roads
Peters Creek Parkway, North Carolina
Virginia State Route 117, known as Peters Creek Road

See also
Peters Brook (disambiguation)